Philip Ryan (17 June 1957 – 8 October 2013), professionally known as Philip Chevron, was an Irish singer-songwriter and guitarist and record producer. He was best known as the lead guitarist for the celtic punk band The Pogues and as the frontman for the 1970s punk rock band The Radiators from Space. Upon his death in 2013, Chevron was regarded as one of the most influential figures in Irish punk music.

Career
Chevron grew up in Santry, a suburb of Dublin. Beginning in the late 1970s, he was lead singer and co-founder of the punk rock group The Radiators from Space, receiving some critical acclaim but little widespread popularity or financial success. Following a temporary breakup of the band in 1981, he lived in London for a while, meeting and befriending Shane MacGowan through time spent working together at a record shop. Following the release of the Pogues' 1984 debut album Red Roses For Me, he was invited to join the band on a short-term basis as cover for banjo player Jem Finer's paternity leave. He took over as guitarist following MacGowan's decision to concentrate on singing—thereby becoming a full-time member of the band in time for the recording of its second album, Rum, Sodomy and the Lash.

Chevron wrote the songs "Thousands Are Sailing" and "Lorelei" among others. He left The Pogues in 1994 following problems with drugs and alcohol. In 2003, he reformed The Radiators (Plan 9) with ex-Pogues bassist Cait O'Riordan. They released the album Trouble Pilgrim in 2006.

In later years, he became The Pogues' unofficial spokesperson and frequently visited online forums, answering questions from fans. In 2004, he oversaw the remastering and re-release of The Pogues' entire back catalogue on CD. He toured regularly with The Pogues, who reunited after a reunion tour in 2001.

Personal life
Chevron was openly gay and penned the anti-homophobia song "Under Clery's Clock", which was first performed in 1987 when The Radiators reformed for one gig, an AIDS benefit in Dublin, and released as a single in 1989.

Illness and death
In June 2007, The Pogues' website announced that Chevron had been diagnosed with oesophageal cancer. In early 2008, the website announced that Chevron had recovered, and that his hearing had returned to almost pre-treatment levels. He embarked on the March 2008 tour of the United States and sang "Thousands Are Sailing" at each performance. By 2009, Chevron was free of cancer.

However, in May 2013, it was announced that the cancer had returned and Chevron was terminally ill. His last public appearance was at the Olympia Theatre for a fundraiser in August of the same year. Chevron died on 8 October 2013 in Dublin at age 56.

Discography
See also The Pogues and The Radiators From Space

Solo
 Songs From Bills Dance Hall (1981, Mosa Records); 12" 45 rpm EP
 The Captains and The Kings (b/w Faithful Departed) (1983, Chapel/Demon Records); 7" 45 rpm

Compilations and anthologies
 For The Children (1990, Alias Records); Includes Philip Chevron on lead vocals on title song.
 Life in the Folk Lane (1992, Demon Records); Includes 1983 recording of "The Captains and The Kings" 
 Life in the Folk Lane Vol. 2 (1995, Demon Records); Includes 1983 recording of "Faithful Departed"
 Bringing It All Back Home Vol. 3 (2000, Valley Entertainment); Includes a new recording of "Thousands Are Sailing"

References

External links

The Pogues official website
The Radiators from Space official website
Tribute from Socialist Democracy

1957 births
2013 deaths
Irish gay musicians
Irish male guitarists
Irish LGBT singers
Irish LGBT songwriters
Musicians from County Dublin
The Pogues members
Irish male singer-songwriters
Gay singers
Gay songwriters
Deaths from cancer in the Republic of Ireland
Deaths from esophageal cancer
The Radiators from Space members
20th-century Irish LGBT people
21st-century Irish LGBT people